A mouse bungee is a device that secures the wire of a computer mouse, preventing the cable from tangling and providing full freedom of movement. It can be made out of plastic, metal, and silicon fabricated tools. In 1994 they were mostly used in offices, but  their popularity rose within the gaming industry, and they are mostly marketed to esports players

Functionality 
The mouse bungee consists of a wide, stable base plate with non-slip bottom and a crane-like, oblique, sprung clamp for the cable, which rises about 10 cm high. In plastic frames a stabilisation weight is incorporated, which ensures the necessary weight. Ideally, it is in front of the Mouse and the cable length is manually set so that the entire mouse pad can be easily reached with the mouse, but does not create unnecessary loops in the cable. The back of the cable remains still on the table without causing an annoyance. Some of the models also feature a USB hub, which asks for adding an additional input cable from the computer, but offers several output options, like USB 2.0 and USB 3.0.

History 
Although DIY cord holders were popular since the introduction of corded computer mice, the first dedicated product came from the company Mouse Bungee, represented by the CEO Ed Larkin. Back in 1994, he introduced a simple solution which offered a mouse cord holder and a mouse pad. Since the idea didn't flourish within the business world, the company sold the project to Razer Inc back in 2010. Later that year Razer introduced a revised version without a mouse pad, and the product ended up as the current market leader within the field of Gaming Mouse Bungees. At that point the trend was created and other companies started following it. Soon enough all the major manufacturers of computer peripherals joined the market with their solution, and today there are over 20 different products on the market.

References 

 , press.razer.com. 
 The inventor of mouse bungees wasn’t actually a gamer, but it doesn’t matter, gdgtpreview.com.

See also 

 Computer accessibility
 Computer Mouse
 Computer

Computer peripherals